The Operational Medal for Southern Africa was instituted by the President of the Republic of South Africa in 1998. It was awarded to veteran cadres of Umkhonto we Sizwe and the Azanian People's Liberation Army for operational service outside South Africa during the "struggle".

MK and APLA
Umkhonto we Sizwe, abbreviated as MK, "Spear of the Nation" in Zulu, was the para-military wing of the African National Congress (ANC), while the Azanian People's Liberation Army (APLA) was the para-military wing of the Pan Africanist Congress. Both were established in 1961 to wage an armed "struggle" against the Nationalist government inside South Africa. On 27 April 1994, Umkhonto we Sizwe and the Azanian People's Liberation Army were amalgamated with five statutory defence forces into the South African National Defence Force (SANDF).

Institution
The Operational Medal for Southern Africa was instituted by the President of South Africa in 1998.

Award criteria
The medal could be awarded to veteran cadres of Umkhonto we Sizwe and the Azanian People's Liberation Army for operational service outside South Africa during the "struggle".

Order of wear

The position of the Operational Medal for Southern Africa in the official military and national orders of precedence was revised upon the institution of a new set of honours on 27 April 2003, but it remained unchanged.

Umkhonto we Sizwe
  
Official MK order of precedence:
 Preceded by the Merit Medal in Bronze (MMB).
 Succeeded by the South Africa Service Medal.

Azanian People's Liberation Army
  
Official APLA order of precedence:
 Preceded by the Bronze Medal for Merit (BMM).
 Succeeded by the South Africa Service Medal.

South African National Defence Force until 26 April 2003
  
Official SANDF order of precedence:
 Preceded by the General Service Medal of the Republic of Bophuthatswana.
 Succeeded by the South Africa Service Medal of Umkhonto we Sizwe and the Azanian People's Liberation Army.
Official national order of precedence:
 Preceded by the General Service Medal of the Republic of Bophuthatswana.
 Succeeded by the South Africa Service Medal of Umkhonto we Sizwe and the Azanian People's Liberation Army.

Description
Obverse
The Operational Medal for Southern Africa is a medallion struck in nickel-silver, 38 millimetres in diameter with a raised rim, and depicts a baobab tree inside a hexagonal frame of chain.

Reverse
The reverse has a wide raised rim and displays the embellished pre-1994 South African Coat of Arms.

Ribbon
The ribbon is 32 millimetres wide, with a 4 millimetres wide red band, an 8 millimetres wide green band and a 1 millimetre wide white band, repeated in reverse order and separated by a 6 millimetres wide black band in the centre.

Discontinuation
Conferment of the Operational Medal for Southern Africa was discontinued upon the institution of a new set of honours on 27 April 2003.

References

Military decorations and medals of uMkhonto we Sizwe
Military decorations and medals of Azanian People's Liberation Army
1998 establishments in South Africa
Awards established in 1998